The 1993–94 A Group was the 46th season of the A Football Group, the top Bulgarian professional league for association football clubs, since its establishment in 1948.

Overview
It was contested by 16 teams, and Levski Sofia won the championship with a record 17 points difference before the second.

League standings

Results

Champions
Levski Sofia

Hubchev left the club during a season.

Top scorers

Source:1993–94 Top Goalscorers

References
Bulgaria - List of final tables (RSSSF)

First Professional Football League (Bulgaria) seasons
Bulgaria
1